Tipton is a census-designated place (CDP) in Tulare County, California, United States. The population was 2,543 at the 2010 census, up from 1,790 at the 2000 census.

Geography
Tipton is located at  (36.059115, -119.310409).

Demographics

2010
The 2010 United States Census reported that Tipton had a population of 2,543. The racial makeup of Tipton was 1,535 (60.4%) White, 3 (0.1%) African American, 15 (0.6%) Native American, 9 (0.4%) Asian, 0 (0.0%) Pacific Islander, 924 (36.3%) Portuguese and other races, and 57 (2.2%) from two or more races. Hispanic or Latino of any race were 2,147 persons (84.4%).

The Census reported that 2,543 people (100% of the population) lived in households, 0 (0%) lived in non-institutionalized group quarters, and 0 (0%) were institutionalized.

There were 610 households, out of which 393 (64.4%) had children under the age of 18 living in them, 353 (57.9%) were opposite-sex married couples living together, 92 (15.1%) had a female householder with no husband present, 80 (13.1%) had a male householder with no wife present.  There were 58 (9.5%) unmarried opposite-sex partnerships, and 6 (1.0%) same-sex married couples or partnerships. 67 households (11.0%) were made up of individuals, and 30 (4.9%) had someone living alone who was 65 years of age or older. The average household size was 4.17.  There were 525 families (86.1% of all households); the average family size was 4.45.

The population was spread out, with 1,036 people (40.7%) under the age of 18, 276 people (10.9%) aged 18 to 24, 745 people (29.3%) aged 25 to 44, 360 people (14.2%) aged 45 to 64, and 126 people (5.0%) who were 65 years of age or older.  The median age was 24.0 years. For every 100 females, there were 107.6 males.  For every 100 females age 18 and over, there were 111.7 males.

The homeowner vacancy rate was 1.4%; the rental vacancy rate was 7.5%.  1,174 people (46.2% of the population) lived in owner-occupied housing units and 1,369 people (53.8%) lived in rental housing units.

2000

As of the census of 2000, there were 1,790 people, 473 households, and 402 families residing in the CDP. The racial makeup of the CDP was 28.99% White, 0.17% African American, 0.56% Native American, 0.45% Asian, 62.51% from other races, and 7.32% from two or more races. Hispanic or Latino of any race were 67.71% of the population.

There were 473 households, out of which 53.3% had children under the age of 18 living with them, 62.8% were married couples living together, 14.2% had a female householder with no husband present, and 14.8% were non-families. 11.6% of all households were made up of individuals, and 5.3% had someone living alone who was 65 years of age or older.  The average household size was 3.78 and the average family size was 4.08.

In the CDP, the population was spread out, with 38.8% under the age of 18, 12.6% from 18 to 24, 26.4% from 25 to 44, 15.4% from 45 to 64, and 6.9% who were 65 years of age or older.  The median age was 24 years. For every 100 females, there were 105.5 males.  For every 100 females age 18 and over, there were 106.0 males.

The median income for a household in the CDP was $26,379, and the median income for a family was $27,069. Males had a median income of $24,362 versus $19,821 for females. The per capita income for the CDP was $8,464.  About 18.3% of families and 20.3% of the population were below the poverty line, including 21.6% of those under age 18 and 16.2% of those age 65 or over.

Government

In the United States House of Representatives, Tipton is in

References

Census-designated places in Tulare County, California
Census-designated places in California